William Thomas Mulvany (11 March 1806 in Dublin, Ireland – 30 October 1885 in Düsseldorf, Germany) was an Irish entrepreneur in Germany.

Life
Mulvany was one of seven children of Catholic parents in Dublin: his father was the painter Thomas James Mulvany. He converted to the Anglican Communion as Catholics were barred from all but the very lowest grades of the civil service. He joined the Ordnance Survey in 1826 and ten years later moved to the Office of Public Works.  In 1832, he married Alicia Winslow, the daughter of a wealthy landowner from Fermanagh. He had five children with her. From 1855 until his death, Mulvany lived in Düsseldorf.
In 1875, he built the "Mulvany Villa" in Herne, but it's not known whether he ever lived there. He died in 1885 and was buried in Düsseldorf. The city of Gelsenkirchen made him an honorary citizen in 1880. In Herne, a street near the former Shamrock coal mine was named after him. Also Castrop-Rauxel, Recklinghausen and Düsseldorf also named streets after the entrepreneur.

Career in Ireland
Mulvany qualified through practical experience as an engineer. He learned technical drawing with an architect and joined the Irish Survey Office at the age of 20 years as a surveyor. In 1836 he became an employee of the Board of Public Works in Ireland. Mulvany was successively responsible for planning of waterways and the modernization of the fishing industry, but especially for the purpose of drainage of large areas of agricultural exploitation. During the Great Irish Famine 1845 - 1849 the projects of the Board of Works were simultaneously job creation schemes for the suffering rural population and in 1853, the work was stopped due to high costs, and Mulvany quit the civil service.
In 1851 he published a paper introducing the rational method in hydrology. Even today, this is regarded as one of the most important steps forward in hydrological planning of drainage systems.

Entrepreneur
Mulvany came in 1855 as a representative and member of a group of Irish investors to Germany to participate in the coal mining in Ruhr. To tap the Hibernia Mine mine in Gelsenkirchen and Shamrock mine in Herne he hired British experts and let them introduce new mining methods. Afterwards he wrote:

 As a result of a short visit to the Head Mining Office and examination of the geological map, I immediately realised what wonderfully extensive riches were  hidden under the earth. I had seen how inadequate in those days were your railways and how insufficiently your canals and transport facilities were used. i said to myself on the spot: these people do not understand what they possess here.

Mulvany's special focus was directing transport, distribution and development of new markets for the coal mined in the Ruhr. That won him the recognition of the public, but did not optimize the yield of the mines. In 1864 he was fired by the owners of Hibernia and Shamrock. When in 1873 the mining company Hibernia was sold, the new corporation hired Mulvany as CEO.

Already in addition to working for the investors, Mulvany planned surveying new mines for his own account. In 1866 he founded with other entrepreneurs, the Prussian mining and metallurgical corporation (PBHAG). The PBHAG included the mines Zeche Hansa and Zollern and the newly created Erin colliery, as well as ore mines and  Vulcan ironworks. Because of costly technical problems during the development of mines and because of a sluggish development of the railway connections caused the PBHAG losses and had to register as insolvent during the Gründerzeit crisis in 1877.

References

1806 births
1885 deaths
Businesspeople from County Dublin
Irish engineers
Irish surveyors
Businesspeople from Düsseldorf
Irish emigrants to Germany
19th-century Irish businesspeople